Joan L. Krajewski (May 31, 1934 – August 29, 2013) was a Democratic politician and former Councilwoman who represented the Sixth District on the City Council of Philadelphia, Pennsylvania for almost 30 years.

Krajewski, who lived in Port Richmond and whose district included much of Lower Northeast Philadelphia, began her political career as a Republican committeeperson. After supporting Frank Rizzo, who was then a Democrat, in the 1971 mayoral election, she soon switched parties. One of a faction of conservative white Democrats who represented working-class Philadelphia neighborhoods and were sometimes described as "Rizzocrats," she was known for her loyalty to her supporters and her skill at political maneuvering and was often described as "tough" and "a fighter."

She succeeded Councilman Joseph Zazyczny in the seat after his resignation in 1979 and served on Council from 1980 to 2012. Krajewski was, prior to her election, an active union official who served as President of  Local 1660-School Board Employees, District Council 33, and the American Federation of State, County and Municipal Employees’ Union. She was also an investigator for the City Department of Revenue. Krajewski was also the Ward Leader of the 65th Ward Democratic Executive Committee since her election to the position in 1978. Krajewski died on August 29, 2013, after recently being diagnosed with COPD.

In 2007, Aaron Krolikowski, sketched a day in the life of the Councilwoman. Following her from the City Council chamber to her office. Where she was interviewed by the Inquirer's Jeff Shields.

References

1934 births
2013 deaths
Philadelphia City Council members
Pennsylvania Democrats
Deaths from chronic obstructive pulmonary disease
Women city councillors in Pennsylvania
21st-century American women